Garvin Cross is a Canadian stuntman, stunt coordinator, and actor. Cross is best known for his role as Angelo in the 1995 martial arts film Rumble in the Bronx, which starred Jackie Chan.

Career
Garvin Cross started his career as Ed Harris's stuntman in the film Needful Things. He later performed as a stuntman in films and television shows including Carpool, Deep Rising, Shanghai Noon, Tron: Legacy, Fantastic 4 and Mission: Impossible – Ghost Protocol. Cross has performed stunts for actors including Daniel Craig and Jeremy Renner.

Cross has acted in films and television shows including Rumble in the Bronx, Blade: Trinity, Battlestar: Galactica, and Marmaduke. He is uncredited as the "Military Snow Commander" in Christopher Nolan's Inception.

He is included in the Guinness Book of World Records for his skills as a precision stunt driver, and he has worked on films and television spots for automobile companies such as Ford, Porsche, Toyota, Dodge, Mercedes, Lincoln, Nissan and Lexus.

Cross is also an experienced stunt coordinator; he has worked on film and television projects including Steven Spielberg's Taken, Lost Boys: The Tribe, Big Time Rush, and Sea of Monsters.

References

External links
 
 
 
 

Year of birth missing (living people)
Living people
Canadian male film actors
Canadian male television actors
Canadian stunt performers